The Dassault Mirage 5 is a French supersonic attack aircraft designed by Dassault Aviation during the 1960s and manufactured in France and a number of other countries. It was derived from Dassault's popular Mirage III fighter and spawned several variants of its own, including the IAI Kfir. Pakistani Mirage 5s are capable of nuclear weapons delivery.

Design and development

Early development
The Mirage 5 grew out of a request to Dassault from the Israeli Air Force. Since the weather over the Middle East is clear and sunny most of the time, the Israelis suggested removing avionics, normally located behind the cockpit, from the standard Mirage IIIE to reduce cost and maintenance, and replacing them with more fuel storage for attack missions. In September 1966, the Israelis placed an order for 50 of the new aircraft.

Mirage 5

The first Mirage 5 flew on 19 May 1967. It looked much like the Mirage III, except that it had a long slender nose that extended the aircraft's length by about half a metre. A pitot tube was distinctively moved from the tip of the nose to below the nose in the majority of Mirage 5 variants.

The Mirage 5 retained the IIIE's twin DEFA guns, but added two additional pylons, for a total of seven. Maximum warload was 4,000 kg (8,800 lb). Provision for the SEPR rocket engine was deleted.

Rising tensions in the Middle East led French President Charles de Gaulle to embargo the Israeli Mirage 5s on 3 June 1967. The Mirages continued to roll off the production line, even though they were embargoed, and by 1968 the batch was complete and the Israelis had provided final payments.

In late 1969, the Israelis, who had pilots in France testing the aircraft, requested that the aircraft be transferred to Corsica, in theory to allow them to continue flight training during the winter. The French government became suspicious when the Israelis also tried to obtain long-range fuel tanks and cancelled the move. The Israelis finally gave up trying to acquire the aircraft and accepted a refund.

Some sources claim that cooperation with France resumed outside the public's eye and Israel received 50 Mirage 5s in crates from the French Air Force, while the French took over the 50 aircraft originally intended for Israel, as Mirage 5Fs. Officially, Israel claimed to have built the aircraft after obtaining complete blueprints, naming them IAI Nesher.

Like the Mirage IIIE, the Mirage 5 was popular with export customers, with different export variants fitted with a wide range of different avionics. While the Mirage 5 had been originally oriented to the clear-weather attack role, with some avionic fits it was refocused to the air-combat mission. As electronic systems became more compact and powerful, it was possible to provide the Mirage 5 with increased capability, even though the rear avionics bay had been deleted, therefore in some sub-versions, the result was a "reinvented" Mirage IIIE.

Reconnaissance and two-seat versions of the Mirage 5 were sold, with the designation Mirage 5R, and Mirage 5D respectively.

The Mirage 5 was sold to Abu Dhabi, Belgium, Colombia, Egypt, Gabon, Libya, Pakistan, Peru, Venezuela, and Zaire, with the usual list of subvariant designations and variations in kit. The Belgian aircraft were fitted with mostly US avionics, and some Egyptian aircraft were fitted with the MS2 attack avionics system from the Dassault-Dornier Alpha Jet.

In 1978 and 1980, Israel sold a total of 35 of their Neshers plus 4 Nesher trainer aircraft (Nesher Ts) to Argentina, where they were locally known first as Daggers and after their upgrade as Fingers. The Argentines lost two Mirage IIIEAs and twelve Daggers during the Falklands War in 1982. As a measure of solidarity, the Peruvians transferred ten of their Mirage 5Ps to Argentina, under the name Mirage Mara, to help alleviate its losses.

South Africa purchased five Nesher trainers for trials during its own Atlas Cheetah fighter programme. All the aircraft were eventually upgraded to Cheetah D standard.

Chile incorporated some Mirage 5s under name Mirage Elkan.

A total of 582 Mirage 5s were built, including 51 Israeli Neshers.

Belgian production 

In 1968, the Belgian government ordered 106 Mirage 5s from Dassault to re-equip No 3 Wing at Bierset air base. All aircraft but the first one were to be license-built by SABCA in Belgium. Component production at the SABCA Haren plant near Brussels was followed by assembly at the SABCA plant at Gosselies airfield, near Charleroi. The ATAR engines were produced by FN Moteurs at this company's Liège plant.
SABCA production included three versions: Mirage 5BA for the ground-attack role, Mirage 5BR for the reconnaissance role and Mirage 5BD for training and conversion.

By the end of the 1980s, a MIRage Safety Improvement Program (MIRSIP) was agreed to by parliament, calling for 20 low-time Mirages (15 Mirage 5BAs and 5 Mirage 5BDs) to be upgraded. Initial plans included a new more powerful engine, but this idea was abandoned to limit cost. The upgrade eventually included a more modern cockpit, a new ejection seat, a laser rangefinder, and canards to improve takeoff performance and overall maneuverability. A new government canceled the MIRSIP but SABCA was allowed to carry out the update, in order to sell the aircraft on the export market. After completion, the Belgian government sold all 20 aircraft to Chile, together with 4 non-upgraded Mirage 5BRs, and one non-upgraded Mirage 5BD.

Mirage 50
The new Atar 09K-50 engine, however, was still an improvement, and fitting this engine led to the next Mirage variant, the Mirage 50, during the 1970s. The uprated engine gave the Mirage 50 better takeoff and climb characteristics than its predecessors. While the Mirage 50 also incorporated new avionics, such as a Cyrano IV radar system, it did not prove popular in export sales, as the first-generation Mirage series was becoming obsolete.

Chile ordered a quantity of Mirage 50s, receiving both new production as well as updated Armée de l'Air Mirage 5s. The Chilean aircraft were later modernised along the lines of the IAI Kfir as the ENAER Pantera. The Pantera incorporates fixed canards and other aerodynamic improvements, as well as advanced avionics. These aircraft have an extended nose to accommodate some of the new systems.

In the early 1990s, Dassault upgraded a batch of Venezuelan Mirage IIIEVs and 5s to Mirage 50 standards.

Mirage 5 ROSE

In 1982, Pakistan Chief of Air Staff ACM  Anwar Shamim acquired an additional squadron of the Mirage 5 from France to provide  effective support to the Navy.

In the 1990s, the PAF launched a Mid-life update (MLU) program, codenamed as Project ROSE (Retrofit Of Strike Element), to its aging Mirage III and Mirage 5 aircraft with modern avionics provided by French, Italian, and Pakistani software conglomerates. The PAF acquired blueprint drawings of the aircraft from France, redeveloping and redesigning it at the Pakistan Aeronautical Complex.

In the first phases of the project, the PAF acquired 33 former Australian Air Force Mirage III fighters were upgraded and designated ROSE I. The PAF then procured surplus Mirage 5F fighters in the late 1990s from the French Air Force in two batches. Around 20 fighters from the first batch were upgraded with new cockpits, navigation/attack suites, defensive aids systems and a forward-looking infrared (FLIR) sensor under the aircraft's nose/cockpit, being designated ROSE II. The cockpits included new MFDs, HUDs, HOTAS controls, radar altimeters and RWRs.

Additionally, there were 14 Mirage 5F fighters from the second batch that were upgraded similarly but with newer systems and designated ROSE III. The FLIR sensors allow the Mirage 5 ROSE fighters to specialise in the night-time attack role.

Operational History

Pakistan 
In February 2019, IAF jets violated Pakistani airspace and bombed a wooded area in Balakot.
Resultantly, Pakistan launched retaliatory airstrikes (Codenamed "Operation Swift Retort") on military installations at Indian Administered Kashmir. During the airstrikes, two Dassault Mirage-5PAs from the No. 15 Squadron dropped their H-4 SOW glide bombs which were guided to their specific targets by Weapon System Officers seated in Dassault Mirage-IIIDAs via data link. The operation was a success and the aircraft returned safely.

Variants
 Mirage 5 : Single-seat radarless ground-attack fighter aircraft.
 Mirage 5AD : Export version of Mirage 5 for Abu Dhabi, UAE; 12 built.
 Mirage 5EAD : Single-seat radar-equipped fighter-bomber version for Abu Dhabi, UAE. 14 built.
 Mirage 5BA : Single-seat version of the Mirage 5 for Belgium, fitted with mainly US avionics; 63 built, 62 under license by SABCA.
 Mirage 5COA : Export version of the Mirage 5 for Colombia. 14 built. Remaining aircraft upgraded by IAI with canards and new avionics.
 Mirage 5D : Export single-seat ground-attack aircraft of the Mirage 5 for Libya; 53 built.
 Mirage 5DE : Single-seat radar-equipped fighter-bomber version for Libya; 32 built. 31 survivors upgraded with radar warning receivers starting in 1975.
 Mirage 5F : Single-seat ground-attack fighter aircraft for the French Air Force. 50 ex-Israeli Mirage 5Js. Eight aircraft withdrawn for conversion to Mirage 50C for Chile, with eight new-build 5Fs built as replacements.
 Mirage 5G : Export version of the Mirage 5 for Gabon. Three built.
 Mirage 5G2 : Four aircraft for Gabon, with provision for a laser rangefinder under the nose; two new-build and two undelivered ex-Zaire 5M.
 Mirage 5J : 50 aircraft were ordered by Israel, but the order was later embargoed by the French government. They were delivered instead to the French Air Force as the Mirage 5F.
 Mirage 5M : Export version of the Mirage 5 for Zaire; 14 built, of which only 11 delivered owing to funding shortages.
 Mirage 5MA Elkan : Upgraded Mirage 5BA aircraft sold to Chile.
 Mirage 5P : Export version of the Mirage 5 for Peru; 22 built.
 Mirage 5P Mara : Upgraded Mirage 5P for Argentina; 10 aircraft sold by Peru.
 Mirage 5P3 : Upgraded aircraft for Peru, with new Litton inertial navigation system, radio altimeter, and new IFF; 10 built.
 Mirage 5P4 : Upgraded aircraft for Peru, with all of the improvements found on the Mirage 5P3, as well as a head-up display, a laser rangefinder, HOTAS controls, in-flight refueling probe, and capable of using R.550 Magic missiles; two new-build plus upgraded older aircraft.
 Mirage 5PA : Single-seat radarless version of the Mirage 5 for Pakistan; 28 built. Later modernized with a head-up display and a Litton inertial navigation system.
 Mirage 5PA2 : New-build aircraft for Pakistan, fitted with the Agave radar; 18 built.
 Mirage 5PA3 : New-build anti-shipping aircraft for Pakistan, also fitted with the Agave radar and compatible with the Exocet anti-ship missile. 12 built.
 Mirage 5SDE : Single-seat radar-equipped fighter-bomber version for Egypt, equivalent to Mirage IIIE; 54 built.
 Mirage 5E2 : Upgraded radarless attack version for Egypt, with a navigation and attack system identical to the one found on the Alpha Jet MS2. 16 built.
 Mirage 5V : Single-seat ground attack aircraft 5 for Venezuela; six built. 2 survivors rebuilt to Mirage 50EV standard, and 1 to Mirage 50DV.
 Mirage 5R : Single-seat reconnaissance aircraft.
 Mirage 5BR : Reconnaissance version of 5BA for Belgium; 27 built, 23 in Belgium.
 Mirage 5COR : Export version of the Mirage 5R for Colombia; two built.
 Mirage 5DR : Export version of the Mirage 5R for Libya; ten built.
 Mirage 5RAD : Export version of the Mirage 5R for Abu Dhabi, UAE; three built.
 Mirage 5SDR : Export version of the Mirage 5R for Egypt; six built.
 Mirage 5Dx : Two-seat training version.
 Mirage 5BD : Two-seat trainer version of 5BA for Belgium; 16 built, 15 built locally.
 Mirage 5COD : Two-seat trainer for Colombia. Two built. Upgraded with canards and new avionics.
 Mirage 5DAD : Two-seat trainer for Abu Dhabi, UAE. Three built.
 Mirage 5DD : Two-seat trainer for Libya; 15 built.
 Mirage 5DG : Two-seat trainer for Gabon; two delivered in 1978.
 Mirage 5DG2 : Two-seat trainer for Gabon; two built, delivered in 1984 and 1985 respectively.
 Mirage 5DM : Two-seat trainer for Zaire; three built, all of which were delivered.
 Mirage 5DP : Two-seat trainer for Peru; four delivered.
 Mirage 5DP3 : Upgraded trainer for Peru, with the same improvements as on the Mirage 5P3; one built.
 Mirage 5DP4 : Upgraded trainer for Peru, with the same improvements as on the Mirage 5P4, except the in-flight refueling probe; one new-build plus upgraded older aircraft.
 Mirage 5DPA2 : Two-seat trainer version for Pakistan; two built.
 Mirage 5DV : Two-seat trainer for Venezuela; three built. One survivor rebuilt to Mirage 50DV standard.
 Mirage 5MD Elkan : Upgraded Mirage 5BD aircraft sold to Chile.
 Mirage 5SDD : Two-seat trainer for Egypt; six built.
 Mirage 50 : multi-role fighter-bomber, ground-attack aircraft, powered by more powerful 49.2 kN (11,055 lbf) dry, 70.6 kN (15,870 lbf) with reheat Atar 9K-50 engine. Available with or without radar.
 Mirage 50C : New-build radar-equipped Mirage 50 for Chile; six built.
 Mirage 50FC : Eight re-engined Mirage 5F aircraft sold to Chile.
 Mirage 50DC : Two-seat training version for Chile. Three built, two with lower powered Atar 9C-3 engine.
 Mirage 50CN Pantera : Mirage 50C and 50FC aircraft upgraded by ENAER with help from the Israeli company IAI for Chile with canards, revised, Kfir style nose and new avionics; 13 50C and FC upgraded plus two 50DC trainers.
 Mirage 50EV : Single-seat fighter-bomber version for Venezuela. Fitted with canards, and an in-flight refueling probe. New Cyrano IVM3 radar, SAGEM inertial navigation system, and head-up display. Equipped with a Sherloc radar warning receiver, and an ALE-40 chaff/flare dispenser. Capable of using the Exocet anti-ship missile. Six new-build, as well as seven upgraded aircraft (two Mirage IIIEV, two Mirage 5V, and three ex-Zairian Mirage 5M).
 Mirage 50DV : Two-seat training version for Venezuela. Similar standard to 50EV, save for the radar, and the refueling probe that can only be used for training (no fuel transfer possible). One new build plus two upgrades (one Mirage 5V and one Mirage 5DV). This variant is also in service with the Ecuadorian Air Force.

Operators

Current
: 75 currently operational, out of 101 delivered, one of which was shot down on 14 March 1986 during Iran–Iraq War by AIM-9 Sidewinder launched by an Iranian Grumman F-14 Tomcat.

 : 92
 Combat Commanders' School, PAF Base Mushaf, Mirage 5PA
 No. 8 Squadron, PAF Base Masroor, Mirage 5PA2, 5PA3, 5DPA2
 9 Squadron, PAF Base Rafiqui, Mirage 5PA - (1973–1984)
 15 Squadron, PAF Base Rafiqui, Mirage 5PA, 5DR (Converted to J-10C in 2022)
 No.18 Squadron, PAF Base Masroor, Mirage 5PA2 - (1981–1989)
 No. 22 Squadron, PAF Base Masroor, Mirage 5PA, 5PA2 - (1984-2004)
 25 Squadron, PAF Base Rafiqui, Mirage 5F ROSE II
 27 Squadron, PAF Base Rafiqui, Mirage 5F ROSE III

Former
  / : 32
 : 10 Mirage 5P and 39 IAI Nesher
 : 106
 : 42, 25 Mirage 5M ELKAN and 17 Mirage 50
 : 18
 : 6 Mirage 50
 : 50
 : 11
 : 61 IAI Nesher
 : 110
 : 40
 : five IAI Nesher; all upgraded to Atlas Cheetah
 : 21, 9 Mirage 5 and 16 Mirage 50 (including 4 rebuilt Mirage 5 that were already used by Venezuela before)
 : 17

Specifications (Mirage 5F)

See also

References

Notes

Bibliography
 Atlejees, Leephy.  Armscor Film by Armscor, SABC and Leephy Atlejees. Public broadcast by SABC Television, 1972, rebroadcast: 1982, 1984.
 Baker, Nigel and Tom Cooper. "Middle East Database: Dassault Mirage III & Mirage 5/Nesher in Israeli Service".www.acig.org, Air Combat Information Group Journal (ACIG), 26 September 2003. Retrieved: 1 March 2009.
 Breffort, Dominique and Andre Jouineau. "The Mirage III, 5, 50 and derivatives from 1955 to 2000." Planes and Pilots 6. Paris: Histoire et Collections, 2004. .
 Carbonel, Jean-Christophe. French Secret Projects 1: Post War Fighters. Manchester, UK: Crecy Publishing, 2016. 
 "Cheetah: Fighter Technologies". Archimedes 12, June 1987.
 
 Cooper, Tom. "Middle East Database: War of Attrition, 1969–1970." www.acig.org, Air Combat Information Group Journal (ACIG), 24 September 2003. Retrieved: 1 March 2009.
 "The Designer of the B-1 Bomber's Airframe".  Wings Magazine, Vol. 30/No 4, August 2000, p. 48.
 Donald, David and Jon Lake, eds. Encyclopedia of World Military Aircraft. London: Aerospace Publishing, 1996. .
 Donald, David and Jon Lake, eds. Encyclopedia of World Military Aircraft. London: AIRtime Publishing, 2000. .
 Green, William and Gordon Swanborough. The Complete Book of Fighters. New York: Smithmark Books, 1994, .
 Jackson, Paul. Modern Combat Aircraft 23: Mirage. Shepperton, UK: Ian Allan, 1985. .
 Jackson, Paul. "Mirage III/5/50 Variant Briefing: Part 1: Dassault's Delta". World Air Power Journal Volume 14, Autumn/Fall 1993, pp. 112–137. London: Aerospace Publishing. .
 Jackson, Paul. "Mirage III/5/50 Variant Briefing: Part 2: Fives, Fifties, Foreigners and Facelifts". World Air Power Journal Volume 15, Winter 1993, pp. 100–119. London:Aerospace Publishing. .
 Jackson, Paul. "Mirage III/5/50 Variant Briefing: Part 3: The Operators". World Air Power Journal Volume 16, Spring 1994, pp. 90–119. London: Aerospace Publishing. .
 Lake, Jon. "Atlas Cheetah". World Air Power Journal 27, Winter 1966. pp. 42–53.
 Pérez, San Emeterio Carlos. Mirage: Espejismo de la técnica y de la política. Madrid: Armas 30. Editorial San Martin, 1978. .
 Rogers, Mike. VTOL Military Research Aircraft. London: Foulis, 1989. .
 Taylor, John W.R. Jane's All The World's Aircraft 1976–77. London: Jane's Yearbooks, 1976. .

Further reading

External links

 Mirage-V MRO at Pakistan Aeronautical Complex (PAC)
 Mirage III/5/50 at FAS.org
 The Dassault Mirage III/5/50 Series from Greg Goebel's AIR VECTORS
 Mirage Argentina, el sitio de los Deltas argentinos (in Spanish) (accessed 2016-08-06)

Tailless delta-wing aircraft
Mirage 5
1960s French fighter aircraft
Single-engined jet aircraft
Aircraft first flown in 1967
Pakistan Aeronautical Complex aircraft
Second-generation jet fighters